The 1979 College Football All-America team is composed of college football players who were selected as All-Americans by various organizations and writers that chose College Football All-America Teams in 1979. The National Collegiate Athletic Association (NCAA) recognizes four selectors as "official" for the 1979 season. They are: (1) the American Football Coaches Association (AFCA) based on the input of more than 2,000 voting members; (2) the Associated Press (AP) selected based on the votes of sports writers at AP newspapers; (3) the Football Writers Association of America (FWAA) selected by the nation's football writers; and (4) the United Press International (UPI) selected based on the votes of sports writers at UPI newspapers.  Other selectors included Football News (FN), the Newspaper Enterprise Association (NEA), The Sporting News (TSN), and the Walter Camp Football Foundation (WC).

Offense

Receivers 

 Ken Margerum, Stanford  (AFCA, AP-1, UPI-1, NEA-1, TSN, WC)
 Art Monk, Syracuse (FWAA)
 Johnny "Lam" Jones, Texas (TSN)
 Rick Beasley, Appalachian State (AP-2)
 Jackie Flowers, Florida State (UPI-2)
 Wayne Baumgardner, Wake Forest (NEA-2)
 Steve Coury, Oregon State (AP-3)

Tight ends 
 Junior Miller, Nebraska  (AFCA, AP-1, FWAA, UPI-1, NEA-1, TSN, WC)
 Mark Brammer, Michigan State (UPI-2)
 Dave Young, Purdue (AP-2)
 Mark Geisler, Ohio (NEA-2)
 Benjie Pryor, Pittsburgh (AP-3)

Tackles 

 Greg Kolenda, Arkansas (AFCA, AP-1, FWAA, UPI-1, NEA-1, WC)
 Jim Bunch, Alabama (AP-1, AFCA [G], FWAA, UPI-2)
 Tim Foley, Notre Dame (AP-2, UPI-1, NEA-1, TSN)
 Melvin Jones, Houston (AFCA, AP-3, WC)
 Stan Brock, Colorado (NEA-2, TSN)
 Steve McKenzie, Purdue (AP-2)
 Irv Pankey, Penn State (NEA-2)
 Ray Snell, Wisconsin (UPI-2)
 Herman Parker, Long Beach State (AP-3)

Guards 

 Brad Budde, USC (AFCA, AP-1, FWAA, UPI-1, NEA-1, TSN, WC)
 Ken Fritz, Ohio State (AP-1, FWAA, UPI-1, NEA-1, WC)
 Ray Snell, Wisconsin (TSN)
 Mike Brock, Alabama (AP-2)
 Pete Inge, San Diego State (AP-2, UPI-2)
 George Stewart, Arkansas (UPI-2)
 Mark Jones, Missouri (NEA-2)
 Mark Goodspeed, Nebraska (NEA-2)
 Wayne Inman, East Carolina (AP-3)
 Craig Wolfley, Syracuse (AP-3)

Centers 

 Jim Ritcher, North Carolina State (AFCA, AP-1, FWAA, UPI-1, NEA-1, TSN, WC)
 Dwight Stephenson, Alabama (AP-2, UPI-2)
 Ray Donaldson, Georgia (AP-3, NEA-2)

Quarterbacks 

 Marc Wilson, Brigham Young (AFCA, AP-1, FWAA, UPI-1, NEA-2, WC)
 Art Schlichter, Ohio State (AP-3, UPI-2, NEA-1, TSN)
 Paul McDonald, USC (AP-2)

Running backs 

 Charles White, USC (AFCA, AP-1, FWAA, UPI-1, NEA-1, TSN, WC)
 Billy Sims, Oklahoma (AFCA, AP-1, FWAA, UPI-1, NEA-1, TSN, WC
 Vagas Ferguson, Notre Dame (AFCA, AP-2, FWAA, UPI-1, NEA-2, WC)
 George Rogers, South Carolina (AP-1, UPI-2, NEA-1)
 James Brooks, Auburn (AP-2)
 James Hadnot, Texas Tech (AP-2, UPI-2)
 Dennis Mosley, Iowa (AP-3, UPI-2)
 Jarvis Redwine, Nebraska (NEA-2)
 Joe Cribbs, Auburn (AP-3, NEA-2)
 Freeman McNeil, UCLA (AP-3)

Defense

Defensive ends 

 Hugh Green, Pittsburgh (AFCA, AP-1, FWAA, UPI-1, NEA-1, TSN, WC)
 Curtis Greer, Michigan (AFCA, FWAA, UPI-2 [DT], NEA-1)
 Jacob Green, Texas A&M (AP-1, UPI-2, WC)
 Rick Antle, Oklahoma State (AP-2)
 E. J. Junior, Alabama (AP-2)
 John Adams, LSU (UPI-2)
 Rush Brown, Ball State (NEA-2 [DL])
 Gerry Gluscic, Indiana State (AP-3)
 Bob Kohrs, Arizona State (AP-3)

Defensive tackles 

 Steve McMichael, Texas (AFCA, AP-1, FWAA, UPI-1, NEA-2, WC)
 Bruce Clark, Penn State (AFCA, FWAA, UPI-1, NEA-1 [NG], TSN, WC)
 Jim Stuckey, Clemson (AP-1, FWAA, UPI-1 [DE], NEA-1, TSN [DE])
 Hosea Taylor, Houston (NEA-1)
 Rulon Jones, Utah State (AP-2, NEA-2, TSN)
 Doug Martin, Washington (AP-2, UPI-2, NEA-2)
 Cleveland Crosby, Arizona (AP-3)
 Dino Mangiero, Rutgers (AP-3)

Middle guards 
 Ron Simmons, Florida State (AFCA, AP-1, UPI-1, NEA-2, WC)
 Ken Loushin, Purdue (AP-2)
 Kerry Weinmaster, Nebraska (UPI-2)
 George Mays, Army (AP-3)

Linebackers 

 George Cumby, Oklahoma (AFCA, AP-1, FWAA, UPI-1, NEA-1, TSN, WC)
 Mike Singletary, Baylor (AFCA, AP-1, FWAA, UPI-2, NEA-2, WC)
 Ron Simpkins, Michigan (AP-1, FWAA, UPI-1, NEA-2, WC)
 Dennis Johnson, USC (UPI-1, TSN)
 Otis Wilson, Louisville (NEA-1, TSN)
 David Hodge, Houston (AFCA, AP-2)
 Dan Bass, Michigan State (AP-2)
 Lance Mehl, Penn State (AP-2, UPI-2)
 Otis Wilson, Louisville (AP-3, UPI-2)
 Tom Boyd, Alabama (AP-3)
 Bob Crable, Notre Dame (AP-3)

Defensive backs 

 Kenny Easley, UCLA (AFCA, AP-1, FWAA, UPI-1, NEA-1, TSN, WC)
 Johnnie Johnson, Texas (AFCA, AP-1, FWAA, UPI-1, NEA-1, TSN, WC)
 Roland James, Tennessee (AFCA, AP-2, FWAA, UPI-1, NEA-1, TSN, WC)
 Don McNeal, Alabama (AP-3, NEA-1, TSN)
 Mark Haynes, Colorado (AP-1, UPI-2)
 Derrick Hatchett, Texas (AP-2)
 Lovie Smith, Tulsa (AP-2)
 Darrol Ray, Oklahoma (UPI-2)
 Mike Guess, Ohio State (UPI-2)
 Willie Teal, LSU (NEA-2)
 Mark Lee, Washington (NEA-2)
 Roynell Young, Alcorn State (NEA-2)
 Vince Skillings, Ohio State (NEA-2)
 Monk Bonasorte, Florida State (AP-3)
 Dennis Smith, USC (AP-3)

Special teams

Kickers 

 Dale Castro, Maryland (FWAA, UPI-1, NEA-1, TSN, WC)
 Ish Ordonez, Arkansas (UPI-2, NEA-2)

Punters 

 Jim Miller, Ole Miss (FWAA, UPI-1, NEA-1, TSN, WC)
 Mike Smith, Wyoming (UPI-2)
 Ken Naber, Stanford (NEA-2)

Key

Official selectors

Other selectors

See also
 1979 All-Big Eight Conference football team
 1979 All-Big Ten Conference football team
 1979 All-Pacific-10 Conference football team
 1979 All-SEC football team

References 

All-America Team
College Football All-America Teams